The Ford 300 is an automobile which was built in the USA by Ford for the model year 1963 only.  It was the base trim level of the full-size 1963 Ford line below the Galaxie, Galaxie 500 & Galaxie 500XL. It featured almost no chrome trim or luxury equipment and could be compared to the Chevrolet Biscayne in trim level.

Ford 300s were often used by police and taxi fleets, and had a base price of more than $100 less than comparable models in the base Galaxie series. However, private customers could also purchase one if low price and economy, with the convenience of a full-sized automobile were the prime objectives.

The car was identified by a "Ford 300" badge on each front fender just behind the wheel wells and "F-O-R-D" in small block letters on the trunk lid. The series was available only as a 2- or 4-door pillared sedan.

An interesting part of this car's history concerns the availability of the big-block FE-series V-8 engines, including the 425-hp 427 cubic inch unit.  Combined with manual transmission, these cars were often used as drag racers due to their light weight.

A special Ford 300 2-door sedan model was known to be sold by Tasca Motors of Providence, Rhode Island.  It featured extra chrome trim from the Galaxie and XL models, and featured interesting two-tone paint combinations.

The Ford 300 was replaced in 1964, by the Custom series.

References

300